Birbeck is a surname. Notable people with the surname include:

Michael Stanley Clive Birbeck (1925–2005), discoverer of Birbeck granules
Birbeck granules, organelles in Langerhans cells
Joe Birbeck (born 1932), English footballer
Shaun Birbeck (born 1972), English cricketer